N-Hydroxypiperidine (also known as 1-piperidinol and 1-hydroxypiperidine) is the chemical compound with formula C5H11NO. It is a hydroxylated derivative of the heterocyclic compound piperidine.

Preparation
N-Hydroxypiperidine can be prepared from the application of meta-chloroperoxybenzoic acid and methanol to the tertiary amine product of acrylonitrile and piperidine, followed by heating with acetone of the resulting tertiary N-oxide.

Reactions
N-Hydroxypiperidine is a secondary amine, which can undergo an oxidation reaction with hydrogen peroxide in methanol as the solvent. This produces a nitrone, which is heteroatomic equivalent to a ketone with a nitrogen instead of an alpha carbon. Competing elimination reactions can occur, as well.

References 

1-Piperidinyl compounds
Hydroxylamines